Glenn Curtis Flear (born 12 February 1959 in Leicester, England) is a British chess grandmaster now living in Montpellier, France. He is the author of several books, some on chess openings and some on the endgame.

He was awarded the International Master title in 1983 and Grandmaster title in 1987.

Flear created one of the greatest-ever chess tournament upsets when, as a last minute substitute, he won the very strong London 1986 event (ahead of Chandler, Short, Nunn, Ribli, Polugaevsky, Portisch, Spassky, Vaganian, Speelman, and Larsen, amongst others). To round off the happy occasion, he married five-time French Women's Champion Christine Leroy during the event. They have two sons, James and Nathan.

He also represented England at the 1986 Dubai Olympiad (earning a team silver medal) and at the European Team Chess Championship at Plovdiv in 2003.

Selected writings
Improve Your Endgame Play, 2000, Everyman Chess. .
Open Ruy Lopez, 2000, Everyman Chess. .
Mastering the Endgame, 2001, Everyman Chess. .
Test Your Endgame Thinking, 2002, Everyman Chess. .
The ...a6 Slav: The Tricky and Dynamic Lines with...a6. 2005, Everyman Chess.  .
Starting Out: Pawn Endings, 2004, Everyman Chess. .
Starting Out: Slav & Semi-Slav, 2005, Everyman Chess. .
Practical Endgame Play – Beyond the Basics: the Definitive Guide to the Endgames that Really Matter, 2007, Everyman Chess. 
Starting Out: Open Games, 2010, Everyman Chess. .
Tactimania: Find the Winning Combination, 2011, Quality Chess. .

References
 (page 79)
OlimpBase – Information about Chess Olympiads and other team chess events

External links
 
 

1959 births
Living people
English chess players
Chess grandmasters
Chess Olympiad competitors
British chess writers
English non-fiction writers
English male non-fiction writers